Ellie Campbell is a British singer. She released four singles and an album between 1999 and 2001. Initially winning a GMTV contest to find a new singer, Campbell released her debut single "Sweet Lies" in March 1999, the single reached #42 in the UK Singles Chart. In August 1999 Ellie released her second single, "So Many Ways", which became her biggest hit, reaching #26 in the charts. Her third and final European single, "Don't Want You Back", peaked at #50 in January 2001 in the UK.

Whilst Campbell was enjoying her chart success, Britney Spears came onto the music scene and the media quickly made comparisons between the two. Her debut album, Ellie, was released in 2001. The album proved to be unsuccessful, it failed to chart in the UK, though it charted at #192 in Australia.

A cover of Dee Dee Warwick's "You're No Good" was due to be the fourth single in the UK, but after the album flopped, plans were shelved despite a music video being shot and played many times on The Box. However, the single did get a release in the United States, but it failed to chart.

In Australia, "Don't Want You Back" was released as her debut single. It reached #44 in 2001, and was in the charts for five weeks. "You're No Good" was released later that year, but failed to chart. In the Netherlands, Campbell was seen on The Music Factory and The Box. Her single "So Many Ways" went into the charts, but it peaked at a disappointing #84. The single stayed in the Dutch Top 100 for 5 weeks.

Discography

References

External links
Ellie Campbell on Myspace

British women singers
British pop singers
Living people
Year of birth missing (living people)